The Aftermath is a collection of songs released following the 'aftermath' of the Thing a Week project by comedy rock musician Jonathan Coulton. The project was originally intended to be Coulton's eighth studio album. After he was convinced to start recording in a professional studio by John Flansburgh, however, Coulton decided to scrap this project and start anew for his next album, which later became Artificial Heart. Tracks 6-9 were written and recorded as part of FRED Entertainment's "Masters of Song Fu" competition.

Track listing

2009 albums
Aftermath